William David Querfeld (October 28, 1877 – January 1, 1953) was an American businessman, farmer, and politician.

Querfel was born in DeWitt County, Illinois. A farmer and grain dealer, he was also in the farm-implement business. Living in Clinton, Illinois, he served as the township's highway commissioner and the county highway commissioner, and served on the district school board. A Republican, he served in the Illinois House of Representatives in 1941–1942. He died at the John Warner Hospital in Clinton, Illinois after suffering a stroke.

Notes

External links

1877 births
1953 deaths
People from Clinton, Illinois
Businesspeople from Illinois
Farmers from Illinois
School board members in Illinois
Republican Party members of the Illinois House of Representatives